The New Caledonia women's national under-20 football team is the highest women's youth team of New Caledonia and is controlled by the Fédération Calédonienne de Football.

Information

Football in Tonga
Tonga's greatest football triumph to date was their triumph in the first ever Polynesian Cup held in 1993 over Samoa and the Cook Islands. Although local players have not yet made their mark on big leagues abroad, the Chief Executive of the Tonga Football Association, Joe Topou, was appointed to the FIFA Executive Committee in 2002. The Tonga association is the only sports organization on the island that employs full-time administrative staff.

The second Goal project
Tonga's second Goal project will develop and improve the national football academy and the associations headquarters in Atele, Tongatapu, which was built in the country's first Goal project. This development work will ensure that all of the Tonga Football Associations needs are fully satisfied. Local matches will be held at the football academy, while the administration's requirements, including the needs of players, officials and spectators, will also be covered. The football school will be transformed into a House of Football.

Records

OFC Championship Record

Current technical staff

Current squad
The following players were called up for the 2019 OFC U-19 Women's Championship from 30 August–12 September in Avarua, the Cook Islands.

Caps and goals updated as of 31 August 2019, after the game against Papua New Guinea.

2017 squad
The following players were called up for the 2017 OFC U-19 Women's Championship

Caps and goals correct after the match against Fiji on July 24, 2017.

External links
New Caledonia Football Federation page
Oceania Football Federation page

References

Oceanian women's national under-20 association football teams
women's